Zelle is a Filipino alternative pop/rock band.

Career
Formed by and named after the group's female vocalist, Jeazell Grutas, the band released their debut album Search for Warmth in 2007 on Sony BMG, which consists of 11 original songs.

At the Myx Music Awards 2008, the band won the award for Favorite Bandarito Performance.

In 2010, Grutas' collaboration with rap artist Gloc-9, titled "Upuan", won five awards including Song of The Year at the 23rd Awit Awards.

Discography
Search for Warmth (2007)
 "Akala Mo Lang"
 "Wrong Way"
 "As You Believe"
 "Di na Sana"
 "Lihim"
 "Coffee Break"
 "Panaginip"
 "Kaibigan Blues"
 "Ikaw ang Hanap"
 "Sabihin"
 "Ikot ng Mundo"

Awards and nominations

References

Filipino alternative rock groups
Musical groups from Metro Manila
Musical groups established in 2007
Female-fronted musical groups